

About Noorul Islam College 
Noorul Islam College of Arts and Science is an offspring of Noorul Islam Trust. A. P. Majeed Khan, a philanthropist is the founder chairman of the trust. The trust has to its credit a few technical and educational institutions, namely, The Noorul Islam College of Engineering (NICE) at Kumaracoil, the Noorul Islam Polytechnic College (NIPC) at Punkarai, the Noorul Islam Community College (NICC) at Kumaracoil, the Noorul Islam Multispeciality Hospital (NIMS) at Neyyatrinkara, the Noorul Islam Dental College (NIDC) at Neyyatrinkara, and the Noorul Islam University (NIU) at Kumaracoil.

The college is situated in the slope of the Velimalai hills in the western ghat near the once the capital of Travancore kingdom, Padmanabhapuram palace. It is about 55 km away from Thiruvananthapuram and 14 km from Nagercoil. The college campus is spread over an area of more than 15 acres of greenery.

Noorul Islam College of Arts and Science (NICAS) was started in 2001 by the Noorul Islam Educational Trust, being affiliated to Manonmaniam Sundaranar University, Tirunelveli, and accredited by NAAC with ‘B’ Grade with a CGPA of 2.66. With a meagre strength of just 75 students offering three courses, Computer Science, Information Technology, and Computer Applications, the college progressed leaps and bounds by adding new courses and infra-facilities. Currently the college has effective student strength of about 1,100 and offers 13 U.G. courses, 6 P.G. courses and 1 Ph.D. course.

List of Courses Offered 

Apart from regular courses, the college also offers certificate courses and diploma courses for regular students in various disciplines.

Noorul Islam Institutions 
Noorul Islam Institute of Engineering, Amaravila, Kerala
Noorul Islam Polytechnic College, Thiruvithamcode, Tamil Nadu
Noorul Islam College of Engineering, Kumaracoil (NICE), Tamil Nadu
Noorul Islam Community College, Kumaracoil, Tamil Nadu
Noorul Islam College of Arts and Science, Kumaracoil, Tamil Nadu
Noorul Islam Softech Pvt. Ltd., Kanyakumari, Tamil Nadu
Noorul Islam Institute of Medical Science (NIMS) & Research Foundation
Noorul Islam College of Dental Science & Super Speciality Dental Hospital
Noorul Islam School of Business Management and Computer Application
Noorul Islam College of Aeronautics and Marine Engineering, Tamil Nadu
Noorul Islam Research and Development (Doctoral) Program
NIMS Heart Foundation, NIMS Medicity
Noorul Islam institute of Medical Science (NIMS) College of Nursing

External links 
NICAS — Noorul Islam College of Arts and Science
NICHE — Noorul Islam Centre for Higher Education
NICE — Noorul Islam College of Engineering
NIPE — Noorul Islam Polytechnic College
NIMS — Noorul Islam Multi Speciality Hospital
NICSTA — Noorul Islam Civil Service Training Academy
NICD — Noorul Islam College of Dental Science
bgBLOG — Bioinformatics Blog Site
bgForum — Bioinformatics Forums

Universities and colleges in Kanyakumari district
Educational institutions established in 2001
2001 establishments in Tamil Nadu
Colleges affiliated to Manonmaniam Sundaranar University